Metarctia kumasina is a moth of the  subfamily Arctiinae. It was described by Strand in 1920. It is found in Cameroon, Ethiopia and Ghana.

References

 Natural History Museum Lepidoptera generic names catalog

Metarctia
Moths described in 1920